Three Figures near a Canal with Windmill is an oil painting created in 1883 by Vincent van Gogh. It was stolen and has not been recovered.

See also
List of works by Vincent van Gogh

References

External links

Paintings by Vincent van Gogh
1883 paintings